Deraeocoris ruber (also known as Mirid Bug) is a species of bug in Miridae family.

Distribution and habitat
This species can be found anywhere in Europe, except for Azores, Canary Islands, Cyprus, Faroe Islands, Finland, Iceland, Malta and parts of Russia and the Caucasus. It is also present in the Nearctic realm and in the Neotropical realm. These bugs inhabits forests, but occur mainly on sunny forest edges and open areas.

Description

Body is remarkably wide and glossy. Adults top (including scutellum) may appear in various color variants, ranging from light brown or orange to black in color, while the cuneus is always red. They have shiny forewings with an unbanded tibiae and the 1st antennal segment. The 1st segment of the antennae and at least the base of the 2nd segment are black.

The nymph of Deraeocoris ruber is black coloured with a pinkish wide abdomen bearing black spines.

Biology
This species has one generation a year. Adults can be found from July to September. These bugs are almost completely predators and are also cannibalistic. They mainly feed on aphids and other small insects. They can be found on various plants, especially on nettles, but also on Rubus, Cytisus and Thistles. Trees are preferred to shrubs, including fruit trees, but they are also rarely found on conifers such as pine (Pinus), larches (Larix) and junipers.

Gallery

Bibliography
  Schwartz, Michael D., and G. G. E. Scudder (2000) Miridae (Heteroptera) new to Canada, with some taxonomic changes, Journal of the New York Entomological Society, vol. 108, no. 3-4
 Henry, Thomas J., and Richard C. Froeschner, eds. (1988), Catalog of the Heteroptera, or True Bugs, of Canada and the Continental United States
 Linnaeus, C., 1758: Systema naturae per regna tria naturae, secundum classes, ordines, genera, species, cum characteribus, differentiis, synonymis, locis. Editio Decima, Reformata. Tomus I. Laurentii Salvii, Stockholm. 824 pp. doi: 10.5962/bhl.title.542 BHL

References

External links
 Trek Nature

Deraeocorini
Bugs described in 1758
Taxa named by Carl Linnaeus
Articles containing video clips
Hemiptera of Europe